Eleanor Legasto Nishiumi, known as Ellen Nishiumi,(born February 22, 1966) is a Filipino television personality most noted as a host of the Oh Tokyo information program for the Japanese-Filipino WINS (World Interactive Network System) cable television studio.

Background 
Nishiumi was born February 23, 1966, in the Philippines, the daughter of Edgardo V. Legasto, a short story writer, and Elsa Diaz.  At the age of 18, she began training with a Filipino dance troupe which performed in Japan.  During her stay in Japan she met Toshiya Nishiumi and they married in Tokyo in 1993. In 1995, a Filipino friend who hosted the small online news program, WINS Japan, asked her to audition as a reporter. Although her Nihongo language skills were poor at the time, she still went on to try and eventually landed the job.

She was later hired as a host reporter for the Oh Tokyo information program for the WINS Filipino-Japanese cable channel. It involved Nishiumi travelling to various tourist attractions in Tokyo and interviewing its locals in Japanese while she presents the show in Tagalog. The series ran for eight years starting from 2000 to 2008, until the channel's closure.

On October 7, 2006, ABS-CBN show Nagmamahal, Kapamilya aired an episode based around her life with Toni Gonzaga portraying Nishiumi.

References 

 The art of stalking Oh Tokyo’s Ellen

External links 
 WINS online television
 Oh Tokyo reports

Filipino television personalities
Living people
1966 births